The 2006–08 Southeastern United States drought was a crippling drought that struck the southeast of the U.S. Several reasons, including an unusually strong Bermuda high pressure and La Niña in the eastern Pacific Ocean (which causes dry conditions across the southern U.S.) were responsible for the drought. 2007 was particularly dry across the region, with rivers and lakes dropping to record-low levels and in some areas.

Formation 

The drought was set in motion by the weather phenomenon La Niña which developed during 2005. La Niña caused dry weather across much of the Southeast, this was evident due to the fact that winter 2005–06 was dry for much of the region. On top of that, the Bermuda High, also known as the Azores High, a hot and dry air mass over the Atlantic, formed unusually far west, and blocked storms from entering the region, a pattern that wouldn't break until 2008. The dryness continued into 2006. However, it was mild in comparison in 2007 and did not cause too many effects. Following that, 2007 was very dry across the Southeastern U.S. receiving record-low rainfall during the year. Mississippi and Georgia each had their driest spring on record, where spring typically is very wet across the region. The following summer was scorching hot and dry across the region with record-breaking wildfires across the region. In fact, August 2007 would end up being the warmest August and second-hottest month of any month across the region. with Knoxville, Tennessee having a daily maximum temperature above  on 16 days that month, and an all-time record.. High temperatures were still in the 90s °F (32+ °C) as far late as the end of October. The drought peaked in October, with over 70%  of the Southeast in D4 or the worst category of drought, known as exceptional. 2007 would be the second-driest year as a whole over the region. North Carolina had its driest calendar year ever; several towns nearly ran out of water.

Recovery

The Bermuda High retreated out into the Atlantic and heavy winter rains during 2007–08 helped alleviate drought, a wet 2008 improved drought across most of the region; however, parts of Western North Carolina remained in drought until 2009.

Aftermath 

It is estimated that the drought caused an economic loss over the region at $1.3 billion and water shortages caused the first importing of water in 100 years, and crops failed across the region, causing catastrophic impacts.

See also 
 2007 North America South and Eastern heatwave

References



Droughts in the United States